Not Forgotten is an EP by Collide, released on September 23, 2008, by Noiseplus Music.

Track listing

Personnel
Adapted from the Not Forgotten liner notes.

Collide
 Eric Anest (as Statik) – noises, remixer (5, 6)
 Karin Johnston (as Tripp9) – vocals

Additional performers
 Whitney Kew – remixer (3)
 T.J. Naylor – remixer (4)

Production and design
 Chris Bellman – mastering
 Glenn Campbell – photography
 Dan Santoni – photography
 Derek Caballero – cover art, photography

Release history

References

External links 
 Not Forgotten at collide.net
 Not Forgotten at Discogs (list of releases)

Collide (band) albums
2008 EPs
Remix EPs